Bessie Hope Wolf (February 18, 1924 – September 7, 2005), known professionally as Hope Garber, was a Canadian-born actress and singer, latterly based in the United States.

Early life 
Garber was born in London, Ontario, to Louis and Fruma Wolf.

Career 
Garber was a popular singer with several dance bands during the 1940s. She later performed on many television programs and commercials in Toronto and Los Angeles. She later hosted a television show on CFPL-TV in London, Ontario, At Home with Hope Garber.

Personal life 
After her retirement she developed Alzheimer's disease, of which she died on September 7, 2005, aged 81. She was survived by three children from her marriage to Joseph Garber, including the stage, film, and television actor Victor Garber. She was Jewish.

Filmography

Film

Television

References

External links

E-Online profile

1924 births
2005 deaths
20th-century Canadian actresses
Actresses from London, Ontario
Canadian film actresses
Canadian television actresses
Deaths from Alzheimer's disease
Deaths from dementia in California
Jewish Canadian actresses
Musicians from London, Ontario
20th-century Canadian women singers
Canadian expatriate actresses in the United States